Jean-Pierre Roche (10 April 1924 – 3 April 1998) was a Swiss field hockey player. He competed at the 1948 Summer Olympics and the 1952 Summer Olympics.

References

External links
 

1924 births
1998 deaths
Swiss male field hockey players
Olympic field hockey players of Switzerland
Field hockey players at the 1948 Summer Olympics
Field hockey players at the 1952 Summer Olympics
Place of birth missing